There are more than 350 suburbs in the Perth metropolitan region (colloquially known as Perth, the capital city of Western Australia)  The name and boundary of a locality (commonly referred to as a suburb in the metropolitan region) is determined under the authority of the Minister of Lands in Western Australia, and form an official component of addresses.

Some of the suburbs are contained within two or three local government areas – these have been marked and cross-referenced.

See also 
 List of islands of Perth, Western Australia
 1955 Plan for the Metropolitan Region, Perth and Fremantle
 Greater Perth
 Metropolitan Region Scheme
 Perth metropolitan region
 Western Australian Planning Commission

References

External links 

 
 
 Perth suburb names, Landgate

 
Perth
Suburbs